Eastbrook Academy is a non-denominational private Christian school in Milwaukee, Wisconsin for grades pre-kindergarten through 12th grade that provides a classical Christian education.

Eastbrook Academy obtains almost half its funding from public money through the Milwaukee school voucher program.

References

External links
Eastbrook website

Christian schools in Wisconsin
Classical Christian schools
High schools in Milwaukee
Education in Milwaukee
Private high schools in Wisconsin
Private middle schools in Wisconsin
Private elementary schools in Wisconsin